Auburn was a brand name of American automobiles produced from 1900 to 1937, most known for the Auburn Speedster models it produced, which were fast, good-looking and expensive. However, after the 1929 Wall Street Crash, and the economic downturn that ensued, Auburn's expensive automobiles, along with its also very expensive sister marques Duesenberg and Cord, saw inevitable sales downturns, and all vehicle business halted in 1937.

After a 1940 bankruptcy reorganization, the former Auburn Automobile Co. merged with the Central Manufacturing Company into Auburn Central Manufacturing (ACM) Corporation, which received large amounts of World War II production work, so much so, that in 1943, they rebranded ACM as American Central Manufacturing. One of their most notable WW II contributions involved manufacturing the bodies of at least three quarters, or about half a million, of the World War II Willys and Ford 1/4ton jeeps.

Corporate history
The Auburn Automobile Company grew out of the Eckhart Carriage Company, founded in Auburn, Indiana, in 1874 by Charles Eckhart (1841–1915).   Eckhart's sons, Frank and Morris, experimented making automobiles before entering the business in earnest, absorbing two other local carmakers and moving into a larger plant in 1909.  The enterprise was modestly successful until materials shortages during World War I forced the plant to close.

In 1919, the Eckhart brothers sold the company to a group of Chicago investors headed by Ralph Austin Bard, who later served as Assistant Secretary of the Navy for President Franklin Delano Roosevelt and as Undersecretary of the Navy for President Roosevelt and President Harry S. Truman.  The new owners revived the business, but it proved unprofitable.  In 1924 they approached Errett Lobban Cord (1894–1974), a highly successful automobile salesman, with an offer to run the company.  Cord countered with an offer to take over completely in what amounted to a leveraged buyout, which the Chicago group accepted.  Cord aggressively marketed the company's unsold inventory and completed his buyout before the end of 1925.

But after the 1929 stock market crash, despite advanced engineering and aggressive styling, Auburn's upscale vehicles were too expensive for the Depression-era market, and around 1935, Auburn started to produce a line of kitchen cabinets and sinks, to keep the company afloat.
Cord's illegal stock manipulations would force him to give up control of his automobile holding company, which included the even more expensive Cord, and Rolls-Royce-priced high-performance Duesenberg brands, as well as Central Manufacturing Co., an 1896 coach-building company that built metal bodies for a number of different car companies, including Auburn.  Under injunction from the U.S. Securities and Exchange Commission to refrain from further violations, Cord sold his shares in his automobile holding company.  In 1937, automotive production of all three marques ended.

Nevertheless, after a 1940 bankruptcy reorganization, the former Auburn Automobile and Central Manufacturing Companies merged into Auburn Central Manufacturing / (ACM) Corporation.

In March 1941, Auburn Central Manufacturing (ACM) landed an important contract with Willys-Overland, initially for 1,600 Willys MA jeep bodies. The first bodies were shipped in April 1941, but more, very large, jeep body manufacturing contracts were gained from both Willys-Overland and Ford Motor Company during World War II. In addition to jeep bodies, ACM also made trailer bodies and aircraft components.

In March 1942, ACM changed its name from Auburn Central to American Central Manufacturing.

ACM then went on receiving orders from Willys-Overland for all body-tubs of their roughly 360,000 World War II 1/4ton, Willys MB jeeps, through 1945; plus roughly midway of their 280,000 or so 1/4ton GPW jeep production, Ford also ordered the remainder of their jeep body tubs from ACM as well ! 
By mid 1943, during peak wartime production, and having built their 150,000th jeep body, the Connersville, Indiana company, and ACM's large buildings complex, together with many more automotive industries there had formed a veritable industrial park, that earned the town the nickname "Little Detroit". Eventually, Jeep body production for Willys continued through 1948.

Post-war, in 1945, kitchen sinks, appliances, and cabinets were chosen as having the largest market potential for ACM's manufacturing capabilities. This indeed became ACM's core product after the war.

Models

The 1904 Auburn was a touring car model. Equipped with a tonneau, it could seat two or four passengers and sold for US$1,000, ($ in  dollars ). The flat-mounted single-cylinder engine, situated at the center of the car, produced 10 hp (7.5 kW). A two-speed planetary transmission was fitted.

In 1926, Errett Cord, now the owner of Auburn, partnered with Duesenberg Corporation, famous for its racing cars, and used it as the launching platform for a line of high-priced luxury vehicles, the Duesenberg Model J.  He also put his own name on one of the first front-wheel-drive cars,  Cord, known as the Cord L-29.

The company employed imaginative designers such as Alan Leamy, chief designer of the 1933 Auburn Speedster, and Gordon Buehrig, designer of the 810/812 Cords. Buehrig joined the company in Indianapolis in 1926 with Duesenberg Motors, and is credited with styling roughly half of the Model Js produced.  Duesenberg built the chassis while the bodies were built either to Duesenberg's own specifications, or to the special order of the buyer, by selected independent body companies.

In 1934, Buehrig was transferred to Auburn Auto where he designed the  1935 Auburn 851 Speedster.  The Speedster was styled or modified to use leftover speedster bodies. Buehrig and a design team were then assigned to E.L. Cord's so-called "Baby Duesenberg" to build a smaller, more affordable car.  Designed by Buehrig in 1933, it became the acclaimed 1936/37 Cord 810/ 812 Cords, a hit at the November 1935 annual New York Automobile Show—acclaimed for advanced engineering as well as revolutionary styling. His design work completed, he left the company in 1937.  [source, daughter Barbara Buehrig Orlando plus the ACDA Museum]    and modified the four-door, Cord built cars such as the Duesenberg Model J (1928–37), the Auburn Speedster (1935–37), and the Cord 810/812 (1936–37) that became famous for their advanced engineering as well as their striking appearance.  The Auburn Boattail Speedster was powered by a 4.6L straight eight that, with the popular supercharger option (150 hp), could top  making it a popular model in the Hollywood market.

The Depression, coupled with Cord's stock manipulations, spelled the end of the company and production ceased in 1937.  The company's art deco headquarters in Auburn now houses the Auburn Cord Duesenberg Automobile Museum and became a National Historic Landmark in 2005.  The Auburn Automobile Company also had a manufacturing plant in Connersville, Indiana, formerly owned by the Lexington Motor Company.

Auburn production specifications
 Auburn 8-Eighty-Eight Sedan

See also
List of defunct United States automobile manufacturers

References

 Auburn & Cord  by Lee Beck and Josh Malks (1996) 
 Auburn Cord Duesenberg by Don Butler (1992)

External links

Auburn-Cord-Dusenberg Club Official Website
Auburn-Cord-Dusenberg Flickr Group
The Auburn Gallery at White Glove Collection
RemarkableCars.com - Auburn Photo Galleries

Motor vehicle manufacturers based in Indiana
Luxury motor vehicle manufacturers
Defunct motor vehicle manufacturers of the United States
Defunct manufacturing companies based in Indiana
Auburn, Indiana
Brass Era vehicles
Vintage vehicles
Vehicle manufacturing companies established in 1900
1900 establishments in Indiana
Vehicle manufacturing companies disestablished in 1937
Defunct brands
1937 disestablishments in Indiana
American companies established in 1900
American companies disestablished in 1937
Sports car manufacturers